Jordan Run is an unincorporated community in Grant County, West Virginia, United States. Its post office  is closed. It was also known as Jordon Run.

The community takes its name from nearby Jordan Run; Jordan Run Falls is about 3 miles downstream of the community.

References

Unincorporated communities in Grant County, West Virginia
Unincorporated communities in West Virginia